Gerrard Mortland "Gerry" Eckhoff farms sheep and beef in the high country near Roxburgh, Central Otago. He is a former New Zealand politician, having served as an ACT New Zealand Member of Parliament.

Member of Parliament

He was first elected to Parliament as a list MP in the 1999 election, having been ranked ninth on ACT party list. In the 2002 election, he was ranked eighth, and remained in Parliament.

He was an ACT party spokesperson on agriculture, fisheries, forestry, biosecurity, rural affairs and land use issues.  He remained a list MP until the 2005 election, in which he was again ranked eighth, but only two ACT MPs were returned.

Outside Parliament
Eckhoff was working for the Meat Industry Excellence Group for a while, but he resigned in April 2013 over differences in strategy.

References 

ACT New Zealand MPs
Living people
New Zealand libertarians
New Zealand list MPs
Members of the New Zealand House of Representatives
Unsuccessful candidates in the 2005 New Zealand general election
21st-century New Zealand politicians
Year of birth missing (living people)